Ambition is a 1991 American thriller film directed by Scott D. Goldstein and written by Lou Diamond Phillips. The film stars Lou Diamond Phillips, Clancy Brown, Cecilia Peck, Richard Bradford, Willard E. Pugh and Grace Zabriskie. The film was released on May 31, 1991, by Miramax Films.

Plot

Cast         
Lou Diamond Phillips as Mitchell Osgood
Clancy Brown as Albert Merrick
Cecilia Peck as Julie
Richard Bradford as Jordan
Willard E. Pugh as Freddie
Grace Zabriskie as Mrs. Merrick
Katherine Armstrong as Roseanne
JD Cullum as Jack
Haing S. Ngor as Tatay

References

External links
 

1991 films
1990s English-language films
American thriller drama films
Films scored by Leonard Rosenman
1990s thriller drama films
1991 drama films
1990s American films